Diogo Figueira da Rocha (born October 9, 1863, in Botucatu – May 1, 1897 on the banks of the Mojiguaçu River), better known as Dioguinho, was a Brazilian career criminal and serial killer acting within São Paulo at the end of the 19th century. He is supposedly responsible for more than 50 murders between 1894 and 1897. Tucked away in the far west of the state, he was hunted down by government task forces and was pronounced dead in 1897 after a shootout with the authorities on the banks of the Mojiguaçu River. The corpse, however, has never been recovered.

His exploits were exhaustively covered by the press at the time, and later the subject of several books, such as Dioguinho, published in 1901 by João Rodrigues Guião, published in 1903 by Antonio de Godoi Moreira e Costa, the film Dioguinho from 1917 and Dioguinho, the matador of the fists of income, of the journalist João Garcia, published in 2002.

See also 
 List of serial killers by country

Notes

References 

1863 births
1897 deaths
Brazilian serial killers
Male serial killers
People shot dead by law enforcement officers in Brazil
People from Botucatu